Thomas Thwaites can refer to:

 Thomas Thwaites (civil servant) (c.1435–1503), English civil servant
 Thomas Thwaites (cricketer) (1910-2000), Australian cricketer
 Thomas Thwaites (designer), British designer